Jee Man-won (born November 20, 1942 in Hoengseong, Gangwon-do) is a South Korean political scientist, journalist and entrepreneur.

See also
 Park Chung-hee
 Rhee Seung-man
 Kim Gu
 Cho Gab-je

External links 
 System Club, established by Ji
 Personal blog

South Korean engineers
South Korean educators
South Korean military personnel
South Korean journalists
South Korean politicians
1942 births
Living people
South Korean anti-communists
Korean people of the Vietnam War